Raton Pass is a 1951 American Western film directed by Edwin L. Marin and starring Dennis Morgan, Patricia Neal and Steve Cochran.

Plot
New Mexico Territory, 1880. Pierre Challon and son Marc have a big ranch -- so big that it encompasses both sides of Raton Pass. The Challons have leased additional acres from a group of homesteaders to accommodate their 10,000 head of cattle. It is an uneasy arrangement, leading to occasional feuding. Against this background, two strangers arrive: a ruthless gunslinger, Van Cleave, along with an attractive woman named Ann. She promptly makes the acquaintance of Marc Challon and before the town realizes it, the two get hitched. The newlyweds are pleasantly surprised by Papa Pierre's wedding gift, a title deed transferring ownership of the ranch to the happy couple.

Ann wants a say-so in the day-to-day operations of her new property. Being a woman in the Old West, of course, no one takes her seriously -- that is, until Marc and Daddy go on a business trip, leaving Ann and a big-city banker named Prentice to (a) engage in a huge but risky land-irrigation venture and (b) embark on a torrid love affair. So when Marc returns, he discovers Ann and Prentice in a romantic clinch, planning to swindle him out of his share of the ranch. But Marc, to everyone's shock, sells his 50% to Ann. He is confident her irrigation deal will backfire and leave her broke, allowing Marc to buy back the land for pennies on the dollar.

Lena Casamajor, a homesteader's niece, has always hankered for Marc. She fears that Ann will despoil the landscape for everyone, ranchers and farmers both. So she sets up a meeting between Marc and the homesteaders. He offers them a deal to finance irrigation for all parties if they agree to help him deny Ann access to the grazing acreage Marc still leases from the homesteaders. Not to be thwarted, Ann hires Van Cleave as ranch foreman to instigate a range war. Soon, bullets fly from all directions. At one point, Van Cleave shoots Marc in the back. Miraculously, he survives. Meanwhile, fed up with the bloodletting, Prentice abandons Ann. Unfortunately, he is shot by Van Cleave for his trouble. The Challons are the only ones who can stop him now -- and they do, but not before the murderous foreman turns his deadly aim on Ann.

Cast
 Dennis Morgan as Marc Challon
 Patricia Neal as Ann Challon
 Steve Cochran as Cy Van Cleave
 Scott Forbes as Prentice
 Dorothy Hart as Lena Casamajor
 Basil Ruysdael as Pierre Challon
 Louis Jean Heydt as Jim Pozner (as Louis J. Heydt)
 Roland Winters as Sheriff Perigord
 James Burke as Hank 
 Elvira Curci as Tia

References

External links

1951 films
Films directed by Edwin L. Marin
Films scored by Max Steiner
Films set in 1880
Films set in New Mexico
American Western (genre) films
1951 Western (genre) films
American black-and-white films
1950s English-language films
1950s American films